Willingen is an Ortsgemeinde – a community belonging to a Verbandsgemeinde – in the Westerwaldkreis in Rhineland-Palatinate, Germany.

Geography

The community lies in the Westerwald between Siegen and Limburg on the boundary with Hesse. Within the community rises the Nister, which after flowing 64 km empties into the Sieg. Likewise within the community is the Westerwald's highest mountain, the Fuchskaute. Willingen belongs to the Verbandsgemeinde of Rennerod, a kind of collective municipality. Its seat is in the like-named town.

History
In 1413, Willingen had its first documentary mention as Wildungen.

Politics

The municipal council is made up of 8 council members who were elected in a majority vote in a municipal election on 13 June 2004.

Economy and infrastructure
Although Willingen is a very small village, there are big firms, such as the Rompf coffin factory. There are a “homeland café” (Heimatcafé), an electrical installation and specialist shop, a tire business and a metalworking firm.

Transport
Right near the community, Bundesstraßen 54, linking Limburg an der Lahn with Siegen, and 414, leading from Hohenroth to Hachenburg, cross each other. The nearest Autobahn interchange is Haiger/Burbach on the A 45 (Dortmund–Frankfurt am Main), some 10 km away. The nearest InterCityExpress stop is the railway station at Montabaur on the Cologne-Frankfurt high-speed rail line.

References

External links
Willingen in the collective municipality’s Web pages 

Municipalities in Rhineland-Palatinate
Westerwaldkreis